1-Diazidocarbamoyl-5-azidotetrazole, often jokingly referred to as azidoazide azide, is a heterocyclic inorganic compound with the formula C2N14. It is an extremely sensitive explosive.

Synthesis 
1-Diazidocarbamoyl-5-azidotetrazole was produced by diazotizing triaminoguanidinium chloride with sodium nitrite in ultra-purified water. Another synthesis uses a metathesis reaction between isocyanogen tetrabromide in acetone and aqueous sodium azide. This first forms isocyanogen tetraazide, the "open" isomer of C2N14, which at room temperature quickly undergoes an irreversible cyclization reaction to form a tetrazole ring.

Properties 
The C2N14 molecule is a monocyclic tetrazole with three azide groups with a molecular weight of 220.16 g.mol−1. It has a molecular equilibrium between a closed and an open form, isocyanogen tetraazide which has been known since 1961, the latter being quickly cyclized to the cyclic tetrazole form (C2N14) at room temperature.

It is one of a family of high energy nitrogen compounds in which the nitrogen atoms do not have strong triple bonds. This conformation is less stable, making the compounds liable to explosive decomposition releasing nitrogen gas.

This tetrazole explosive has a decomposition temperature of 124 °C. It is very sensitive, with impact sensitivity lower than 0.25 Joules. It is, however, less sensitive than nitrogen triiodide. Decomposition can be initiated by contact or using a laser beam. For these reasons, it is often erroneously claimed to be the world's most sensitive compound.

See also

References

External links 
 
 

Tetrazoles
Organoazides
Explosives
Explosive chemicals